The Wrecking Ball World Tour was a concert tour by Bruce Springsteen and the E Street Band to promote Springsteen's seventeenth studio album, Wrecking Ball, which was released on March 5, 2012. It was the first tour for the E Street Band without founding member Clarence Clemons, who died on June 18, 2011. The worldwide tour in support of the album, which ended in September 2013, reached 26 countries, the most ever for one of Springsteen's tours. The tour resumed in January 2014 to promote Springsteen's new album, High Hopes, and went under that album's name.

In an attempt to fill the void left by Clemons, Springsteen added a full horn section, which included Jake Clemons, Clarence's nephew. Three background singers and a percussionist were also added, giving the E Street Band its largest lineup ever at seventeen members. As with previous tours, Springsteen's wife and band member, Patti Scialfa, did not appear at all the shows due to family commitments. Guitarist Steven Van Zandt was also unable to perform on the band's Australian leg due to the filming of his television show, Lilyhammer. Van Zandt was replaced by Tom Morello for those dates.

The tour featured over 215 different songs performed, including some songs either making their live debuts or returning after an extended absence.

The tour was named the second highest-grossing tour of 2012 and was the most attended tour of the year, winning the Billboard Touring Award for Top Draw. For the first half of 2013, the tour was named one of the top three grossing tours for the year.

At the end of 2012, the tour placed second on Pollstar's "Top 100 Worldwide Tours", grossing $210.2 million from 81 shows in Europe. At the end of 2013, the tour placed fifth on Pollstar's "Top 100 Worldwide Tours", grossing $145.4 million from 46 shows in Europe. Overall, the tour grossed $340.6 million from 124 shows.

Itinerary

Planning and rehearsals 
Private rehearsals started in late January 2012 at the Expo Theater in Fort Monmouth, New Jersey, the same site where rehearsals were held for the Tunnel of Love Express Tour and the Rising Tour. Some rehearsals were held at the Sun National Bank Center in Trenton to allow the band and crew to try a new stage design.

It was announced on February 9, 2012, that Eddie Manion and Clarence Clemons's nephew, Jake Clemons, would share saxophone duties with Clemons handling most of the lead solos. Additional horns were provided by Clark Gayton, Curt Ramm, and Barry Danielian. Everett Bradly provided percussion and backing vocals while Curtis King Jr. and Cindy Mizelle returned as background singers. Michelle Moore joined the tour as a background singer featuring on Rocky Ground for the rap (as on the album).

In advance of the album's release on March 5, 2012, the band kicked off a string of warm-up performances prior to the tour, including a performance of the album's first single, "We Take Care of Our Own", at the 54th Grammy Awards. During the final week of February, talk show host Jimmy Fallon dedicated an entire week of his show, Late Night with Jimmy Fallon, to Springsteen's music. Different artists covered Springsteen's songs each night of that week.

The new touring lineup performed their first full show together on March 9, 2012, at the Apollo Theater. Springsteen then gave a keynote speech at the SXSW convention in Austin, Texas, on March 15, 2012, and was joined later in the evening by the E Street Band for a -hour set before a crowd of a few thousand.

Ticket sales 
On January 26, 2012, dates for the first U.S. leg of the Wrecking Ball world tour were announced to the public, with many going on sale during the first weekend of February.

Much like with the previous tour, many U.S. fans encountered problems, thought to be due to ticket scalpers, through Ticketmaster as the first dates of the tour went on sale. Shows were selling out within minutes and many tickets appeared, at much higher prices, on resale websites such as StubHub less than an hour after the onsale time. Ticketmaster said web traffic was 2.5 times the highest level of the past year during the online sales. U.S. Representative Bill Pascrell, who introduced the BOSS ACT in 2009 to increase transparency in the ticket industry, said he would reintroduce the bill in Congress.

The show 
The world tour began on March 18, 2012, in Atlanta. The early shows established a routine of using "Tenth Avenue Freeze-Out", performed as the show closer, as a tribute song to Clarence Clemons. Following the lyric the Big Man joined the band, Springsteen paused the song so the band and audience could pay tribute to Clemons, following which the band resumed the remainder of the song. "My City of Ruins" was used as the band introduction song and frequently included a Springsteen rap about "ghosts", referring to Clemons and Danny Federici, the long-time E Street Band organist who died during the Magic Tour in April 2008. For cities that had more than one consecutive show, American Land was used as the show closer, with the entire band on the front line and finishing the show on the main center platform.

Per Springsteen's standard practice, the set list varied from night to night, sometimes significantly. The tour saw the revival of a number of long-absent aspects of Springsteen's concerts, such as the return (during some shows) of a lengthy instrumental introduction to "Prove It All Night" that fans had unsuccessfully requested during the "sign request" (also sometimes known as "Stump the Band") segments during the Magic and Working on a Dream Tours. The instrumental introduction had been a noted point of 1978's Darkness Tour show but had not been played since. Shows were longer than on recent tours, culminating in Helsinki on July 31, 2012, with the longest performance of Springsteen's career at 4 hours and 6 minutes. Earlier the same night, prior to the show proper, Springsteen had performed a five-song acoustic set for early arrivals.

During the encore of Springsteen's show in London at the Hard Rock Calling festival, the city council pulled the plug on his performance because he ran a few minutes past the show's 10:30 pm curfew. Springsteen was performing "I Saw Her Standing There" and "Twist and Shout" with Paul McCartney when their microphones and instruments were shut off. Springsteen ended the set with a brief a cappella, unamplified version of "Goodnight Irene." The incident resulted in the show being the lone concert on the tour at which "Tenth Avenue Freeze-Out", with its Clarence Clemons tribute, was not performed. Following the performance, Steve Van Zandt took to Twitter and said, "English cops may be the only individuals left on earth that wouldn't want to hear one more from Bruce Springsteen and Paul McCartney!" and followed that up with "There's no grudges to be held. Just feel bad for our great fans. Hard Rock is cool. Live Nation is cool. It's some City Council stupid rule." When Springsteen next performed three nights later in Ireland, he poked fun at the London incident. During "Dancing in the Dark" the big screens by the stage displayed only a battery switched "On." A fake policeman came out to the stage to stop them playing "Twist and Shout" but Springsteen refused. While playing American Land, the fake policeman pulled the plug, but Van Zandt plugged it back in.

The tour returned to the United States in August 2012 and focused on baseball and football stadiums. The tour's third (and final) show at MetLife Stadium on September 22, 2012, was delayed for two hours due to a strong thunderstorm. The show finally got underway around 10:30 pm, prompting fans to sing "Happy Birthday" to Springsteen at midnight to celebrate his 63rd birthday. At the end of the show, Springsteen was presented with a guitar-shaped birthday cake onstage.

On October 29, 2012, the New Jersey area was hit hard by Hurricane Sandy. Springsteen's show in Rochester, New York, the following day was forced to be postponed until October 31, 2012. That night, Springsteen dedicated his performance to those affected by the storm and those helping to recover. Springsteen and the E Street Band performed "Land of Hope and Dreams" during a one-hour televised telethon called Hurricane Sandy: Coming Together on November 2, 2012. Springsteen also joined Billy Joel, Steven Tyler and Jimmy Fallon for a performance of "Under the Boardwalk". He later participated in the 12-12-12: The Concert for Sandy Relief at Madison Square Garden, a benefit concert for Sandy victims.

Due to filming of his television show, Lilyhammer, Steven Van Zandt was forced to miss the Australian leg of the tour in 2013. Tom Morello replaced Van Zandt for those dates. Van Zandt made his return in late April 2013 when he opened the first of the band's two shows in Oslo, Norway, by singing Frank Sinatra's "My Kind of Town" in character as Frank "the fixer" Tagliano from Lilyhammer. As with 2009's Working on a Dream Tour, some shows featured full-album performances of Born to Run, Darkness on the Edge of Town, and Born in the U.S.A. The European leg ended in late July 2013.

The final leg of the tour took place in September 2013 with Springsteen's first-ever show in Santiago, Chile, on September 12. The tour subsequently featured dates in Argentina and Brazil, with the final show at the Rock in Rio festival on September 21. The show, which was held at Cidade do Rock, was broadcast live on cable in Brazil and over the Internet via YouTube. In the concerts in Brazil, Springsteen performed a cover of "Sociedade Alternativa" by Raul Seixas in addition to his usual setlist.

Critical and commercial reception 
The tour was a commercial success and was named the second highest-grossing tour of 2012, finishing behind Madonna, and was the most attended tour of the year, winning the Billboard Touring Award for Top Draw. It was also named the 21st highest-grossing tour worldwide as of December 2012. In July 2013, the tour was named one of the top three grossing tours for the first half of 2013, along with tours by Bon Jovi, who had grossed the highest so far, and the Rolling Stones.

Springsteen was named the #1 musical act by Rolling Stone magazine in their August 2013 issue.

Aftermath and Springsteen's response 
During the tour, Springsteen felt inspired to start working on his eighteenth studio album, which eventually became High Hopes. The album was recorded in 2013 during breaks in the Wrecking Ball Tour and was released in January 2014. Springsteen cited Morello, who helped re-introduce some previously recorded songs and cover songs to the recording sessions and live shows, as a huge inspiration on the album.

Broadcasts and recordings 
A number of the festival dates performed on the tour had excerpts from the performance broadcast on television. Additionally, 45 minutes of the 2012 Hyde Park show in London was released as a bonus feature on the Springsteen & I DVD release.

Coinciding with the Born in the U.S.A. album's 30th anniversary, Born in the U.S.A. Live: London 2013, a live DVD of the full performance of the album recorded at the 2013 Hard Rock Calling festival, was released through Amazon.com as part of a deluxe edition of the High Hopes album.

Several shows were released as part of the Bruce Springsteen Archives:
 Apollo Theater 3/09/12, released November 17, 2014
 Ippodromo delle Capannelle, Rome 2013, released November 11, 2015
 Olympiastadion, Helsinki July 31, 2012, released May 23, 2017
 Leeds July 24, 2013, released November 9, 2018
 East Rutherford, NJ 09.22.12, released June 7, 2019
 Gothenburg July 28, 2012, released April 3, 2020
 St. Paul November 12, 2012, released January 8, 2021.
 Fenway Park August 15, 2012, released August 6, 2021.
 Paris July 4 and July 5, 2012, released July 1, 2022

Set list 
This set list is representative of the tour's average setlist as conducted by Setlist.fm, which represents all concerts for the duration of the tour.

 "We Take Care of Our Own"
 "Wrecking Ball"
 "Death to My Hometown"
 "My City of Ruins"
 "Spirit in the Night"
 "Out in the Street"
 "Hungry Heart"
 "Prove It All Night"
 "Jack of All Trades"
 "The Promised Land"
 "Badlands"
 "She's the One"
 "Working on the Highway"
 "Because the Night"
 "Darlington County"
 "The River"
 "Shackled and Drawn"
 "Waitin' on a Sunny Day"
 "The Rising"
 "Land of Hope and Dreams"
 "Thunder Road"
Encore
"We Are Alive"
 "Rocky Ground"
 "Born in the U.S.A."
 "Born to Run"
 "Dancing in the Dark"
 "Tenth Avenue Freeze-Out"
 "Twist and Shout" (The Top Notes cover)

Shows

Supporting acts 
Tom Cochrane – August 26, 2012, Moncton
The Trews – August 26, 2012, Moncton
The Black Crowes – June 22, 2013, Nijmegen
Jamie N Commons – June 22, 2013, Nijmegen 
The Cyborgs - July 11, 2013, Rome  
Josh Ritter & The Royal City Band – July 27, 2013, Nowlan Park
Glen Hansard – July 27, 2013, Nowlan Park
Damien Dempsey – July 27, 2013, Nowlan Park
Imelda May – July 28, 2013, Nowlan Park
LAPD (Liam O'Flynn, Andy Irvine, Paddy Glackin & Dónal Lunny) – July 28, 2013, Nowlan Park
Delorentos – July 28, 2013, Nowlan Park

Personnel

The E Street Band 
Bruce Springsteen – lead vocals, lead guitar, rhythm guitar, acoustic guitar, harmonica, piano
Roy Bittan – piano, synthesizer, accordion
Nils Lofgren – rhythm guitar, lead guitar, pedal steel guitar, acoustic guitar, accordion, background vocals
Patti Scialfa – background vocals, some duet vocals, acoustic guitar, occasional tambourine (did not appear at every show due to family commitments)
Garry Tallent – bass guitar,  background vocals, rare tuba
Steven Van Zandt – rhythm guitar, lead guitar, mandolin, acoustic guitar, background vocals, occasional featured lead vocal
Max Weinberg – drums, rare tambourine
and
Soozie Tyrell – violin, acoustic guitar, percussion, background vocals
Charles Giordano – organ, accordion, electronic glockenspiel, rare piano, occasional background vocals

with
Tom Morello – guitar, backing vocals, co-lead vocals on "The Ghost of Tom Joad" (Morello filled in for Van Zandt during the Australian leg of the tour)

The E Street Horns:
Jake Clemons – saxophone, percussion, background vocals
Eddie Manion – saxophone, percussion
Curt Ramm – trumpet, percussion
Barry Danielian – trumpet, percussion
Clark Gayton – trombone, tuba, percussion

The E Street Choir:
Curtis King – background vocals, tambourine
Cindy Mizelle – background vocals, tambourine
Michelle Moore – background vocals, rapping on Rocky Ground
Everett Bradley – percussion, background vocals

Guest musicians/appearances 
Jarod Clemons (3/23/12, 12/6/12)
Peter Wolf (3/26/12)
Adele Springsteen (3/29/12, 9/22/12, 9/30/13 – Bruce's mother danced with her son on "Dancing in the Dark", presented him onstage with a cake on his birthday)
Tom Morello (4/26/12, 4/27/12, 7/14/12, 9/7/12, 9/8/12, 12/4/12, 2013 Australian leg)
Dr. John (4/29/12)
Kevin Buell (5/2/12 – Bruce's guitar tech performed guitar on "Waiting on a Sunny Day")
Garland Jeffreys (5/29/12, 12/6/12)
Mumford & Sons (5/29/12)
Elliott Murphy (6/11/12, 5/3/13, 6/29/13)
Southside Johnny (6/17/12)
Jessica Springsteen (7/5/12 – Bruce's daughter danced with her father during "Dancing in the Dark")
The Roots (7/7/12)
John Fogerty (7/14/12)
Paul McCartney (7/14/12)
Ken Casey (8/15/12)
Tom Cochrane & Red Rider (8/26/12)
 Olivia Tallent (9/2/12 – Garry's daughter performed backing vocals on "Working on the Highway" with Michelle Moore's daughter)
Eddie Vedder (9/7/12, 9/8/12)
Ali Weinberg (9/14/12, 7/28/13 – Max's daughter performed accordion on "American Land", backing vocals on "Twist and Shout" and "Shout")
Vini "Mad Dog" Lopez (9/19/12) 
Gary U.S. Bonds (9/21/12, 9/22/12)
Virginia Springsteen Shave (9/22/12- Bruce's sister helped celebrate Springsteen's birthday onstage during show)
Vivienne Scialfa (9/22/12- Bruce's mother in law helped celebrate Springsteen's birthday onstage during show)
Mike Scialfa (9/22/12- Bruce's brother in law helped celebrate Springsteen's birthday onstage during show)
Maureen Van Zandt (9/22/12- Steve's wife helped celebrate Springsteen's birthday onstage during show)
Joe Grushecky and son Johnny (10/27/12)
Mike Ness (12/4/12)
Sam Moore (12/6/12)
Jimmy Barnes (3/30/13, 3/31/13)
Jon Landau (5/14/13)
Gaspard Murphy (6/29/13)
Pamela Springsteen (6/30/13 – Bruce's sister was brought onstage and sang during "Dancing in the Dark")
Jay Weinberg (7/5/13)
Ben Harper (7/13/13)
Eric Burdon (7/23/13)
Glen Hansard (7/27/13)
Jon Bon Jovi (12/12/12)

See also 
 List of highest-grossing concert tours

Notes

References

External links 
 Bruce Springsteen (Official Site)
 Backstreets.com Tour Info & Setlists
 Bruce Springsteen Wrecking Ball Tour Blog (Fan blog)

Bruce Springsteen concert tours
2012 concert tours
2013 concert tours